Parasphyraena is an extinct genus of prehistoric perciform fish.

See also

 Prehistoric fish
 List of prehistoric bony fish

References

Prehistoric perciform genera
Miocene fish of Asia